Hanne Hagary (born 27 January 1989) is a Dutch footballer who plays as an attacking midfielder for Dutch Derde Divisie club JOS Watergraafsmeer.

Club career
In his youth, he played for XerxesDZB, an amateur club based in Rotterdam. He later moved to the Feyenoord youth academy. He never managed to break through to Feyenoord's first team, so he was loaned out to Excelsior. In 2010, he signed with Almere City in the Dutch second division. On 16 June 2011, he signed for FC Lisse.

On 1 May 2018, Hagary moved to JOS Watergraafsmeer.

International career
Represented his homeland at U-15, U-16 and U-17 level.

References

External links
 Futbolmercado Profile
 Voetbal International
 

1989 births
Living people
Dutch footballers
Association football midfielders
Eredivisie players
Eerste Divisie players
Derde Divisie players
Feyenoord players
Excelsior Rotterdam players
Almere City FC players
Footballers from Rotterdam
FC Lisse players
Netherlands youth international footballers
XerxesDZB players
IJsselmeervogels players
JOS Watergraafsmeer players